Grias haughtii is a species of woody plant in the Monkeypot family Lecythidaceae. It is found only in Colombia in non-flooded lowland forests.

References

haughtii
Least concern plants
Endemic flora of Colombia
Taxonomy articles created by Polbot